Traditional Ukrainian wedding – is a wedding in Ukrainian folk everyday life – a complex mixture of rites of different days, in which elements of the ancestral exogamic era, Greek-Byzantine religious-mystical influences and newer Ukrainian ones are distinguished. The main acts:

 Matchmaking (in which the consent of the bride to marriage is ian important moment)
 Engagement
 Decorating a hiltse (Ukrainian ritual tree)
 Baking of a korovai (traditional Ukrainian bread, most often served at weddings, where it has great symbolic meaning)
 Inviting guests
 Bachelorette party
 Church ceremony
 Wedding train (a solemn procession accompanying the groom to the bride)

 Pereyma (overcoming obstacles on the way to a bride)
 Untying the bride's braid
 Giving out a korovai
 Moving the bride to of the groom
 "Treating a bride" – the bride was brought to the house of her in-laws, and after sitting in the home altar, she was given a piece of clay from the oven, and her wimple was thrown on the oven
 «Komora» (Englisch for «larder») – the place of the newlyweds' first wedding night
 Perezva – After the first wedding night, the bride's relatives went or went to the groom's house with the appropriate ritual songs for a treat.
 Bringing out of the altar. In later times, the ritual was greatly simplified.

The wedding rite in the system of family rites, as a component of the spiritual culture of Ukrainians, is one of the most ancient and complex. A wedding, as the name indicates, is a joyful and cheerful rite of marriage of young people.

A traditional Ukrainian wedding includes three mandatory cycles: pre-wedding, wedding and post-wedding, each of which consists of separate ceremonies.

Pre-wedding cycle:

 matchmaking
 umovyny / ohliadyny – acquaintance with the groom's household, which took place shortly after a successful matchmaking
 engagement

Wedding cycle:

 bachelorette party
 baking shyshky
 baking a korovai
 «Posad» of the newlyweds – the place at the table where the bride and groom sit during the wedding
 giving gifts
 braiding and covering the bride
 transportation of the dowry

Post-wedding cycle:

 feast.

Zmovyny 
At first there were zmovyny, on which a marriage contract was signed, which was recorded in government books and signed by witnesses and newlyweds. Simple people did not write conditions in the government books, but agreed in the presence of witnesses. Relatives and friends were invited to zmovyny. Besides this, posah (dowry), vino (bride price), and pryvinok (gifts) were also negotiated. «Posah» was called things that parents gave to a girl: money, gold and silver jewelry, necklaces, silver, copper, zinc untensils, clothes, horses, servants. If the bride had no brothers, she was also given land and in case the land belonged to the mother, it did not go to the sons, but to the daughters. The groom wrote down the vino and pryvinok. The custom of giving vino (bride price) has been going on since knyaz’ times (Kniaz’ – a historical Slavic title, used both as a royal and noble title in different times of history and different ancient Slavic lands), but it was first given as a ransom, and later it was written down to the bride herself. The posah, vino and pryvinok were written down in the «zmovyny letter». The letter also wrote down when the wedding was to take place. A monetary guarantee was also written in the letter, in case one of the parties does not comply with the conditions. Zmovyny letters were recorded in government act books. After marriage, the wife independently owned her vino, she also had the right to dispose of her own or acquired estates, that is, she had the right to sell, donate or pledge. 

After zmovyny there was an engagement and after the engagement there was a wedding. After that, the couple was considered married.

Matchmaking 
First, the boy went to the bride's house together with the starosty (In Ukraine, mediators during matchmaking; as a rule, close relatives, respectable married men who were sociable and witty) with bread and delicious food. If the girl's parents agreed, they gave their blessing and the girl brought the wedding towel to the groom and tied the towel to the father-in-law and mother-in-law, and tucked the embroidered shawl behind the boy's belt. If the girl did not agree to get married, then instead of towels she brought out a pumpkin.

Engagement 

On the second day, the «engagement» took place. People came to the girl's house. Also, the groom came with groomsmen, his family and relatives with music and sat down at the table. During the feast, the groom was giving gifts and treats, after that the parents blessed with bread and rye. Then the young couple sat at the home altar while the guests were singing songs.

Ohliadyny 
A day later, the girl's parents, together with their family, went to the boy's house to get acquaintanted with the groom's household.

Preparation for the wedding

Hiltse 

On Saturday evening, people were making «hiltse» (other names are «vyltse», «viltse», «tree», «rishchka») – a small Ukrainian ritual tree or branch which was decorated with flowers, it was also accompanied by songs, dances and supper. On the same day, women were baking korovai which was decorated with dough birds and flowers. Hiltse (sacred tree) was stuck into bread and decorated with candles, viburnum, gilded nuts, apples, rue, and colored candles. It was placed in the corner opposite the icons. Hiltse was decorated from top to bottom.

Wreaths 
Periwinkle wreaths are made at the same time. It should also be made clear that finished wreaths were gilded. Other girls had wreaths of rue and mint. The custom of weaving wreaths is very old. Among the Boiks, for example, collecting periwinkles for a wreath was a whole ritual. The custom of weaving wreaths is an ancient attribute of the solar cult and especially of marriage. According to de Bauplan, in the 17th century, all the girls who went to invite to a wedding wore wreaths on their hands.

Wedding invitations 
When hiltse and wreaths were ready, the bride and the girls went to invite people to the wedding. It was necessary to leave the house in the direction of the sun. At the same time, the groom with his groomsmen also was walking and inviting people to their wedding. The bride bowed to everyone who was present in the house and even to the children, after that she served bread baked in the form of a cone. Before leaving, she was given gifts collected by bridesmaids and small money for a metal plate that is attached to the shoe. If there was also a girl in the house, she joined them after being invited to the cortege. 

After the invitations, the bride returns to the house, where she sits down on an above mentioned «posah». Later, the groom arrives with groomsmen and gifts, and also sits down next to the bride. After the supper, dancing continued all night, and the groom stayed there.

Korovai 

Married women baked korovai. Each woman who was involved in this had to bring some flour, eggs, butter, etc. with her. Newlyweds bloomed themselves with periwinkles and washed their hands. During the preparation of the korovai, the bakers sang ritual songs. Korovai was decorated with the sun, moon, and doves made from the dough. The top of it was decorated with a ring of dough. A cone painted in red was stuck on top. In addition to korovai, people also baked shyshky – wedding ceremony cookies in Ukraine, dyven’ (wedding bread in the form of a thick ring), and lezhen’(Ukrainian wedding ritual bread). After the korovai was placed in the oven, dances began with a bread shovel and a bread trough in which the dough was kneaded.

Church ceremony 
The church ceremony took place on Sunday before lunch, after that everyone went home. Thenceforth, the groom visited his bride. At the entrance, there was a ransom of the bride. The church ceremony was performed by an experienced priest. The newlyweds could choose the church they liked the most.

Wedding 

Actually, the wedding itself begins with the organization of the train of the groom to the bride. Everything starts with lunch at the groom's. To the sounds of music, guests gather at his house. The groom leaves the house together with boyary (another word for «groomsmen») and greets the company three times. Afterwards he points to the boys who will go with him. The boyar takes off the hats of the boys and to each of the hat there was sewed a red ribbon or bunches of periwinkles. So, this company of boys was called «boyary», and the youngest was called a «kniaz’».The same awards were given to svitylka – the girls who were present in the groom's train. The young man was sitting in a home altar, on the right side were sitting groomsmen, and on the left svitylka. After dinner, the boyar was collecting money, and after those certain rites were held.

Thenceforth, people were dressing up for the road while singing. When the groom was leaving, wedding flags were carried in front of him. In most areas, the groom and his company rode on horseback. On the way to the bride, there were «pereymy», when the groom had to pay money and treat those who stopped him. On the way to the bride, there were, when the groom had to pay money and treat those who stopped him.

The groom's train stopped before the closed gate. Two boyary went to the yard from the side of the groom and met two boyary from the side of the bride at the table in the middle of the yard. After "negotiations" at the table («ransom» of a bride), the groom was allowed into the yard.

The bride's mother came out to meet groom's train in a turned-out coat and with a bowl of water and oats in her hands. After the groom sat down next to the bride, the distribution of gifts among the girl's relatives began. From the bride's side, everyone was presented with embroidered towels.

After that, they started covering, unbraiding the braid and putting on the serpanok. (a married woman's headdress of transparent, light fabric, having the appearance of a scarf). The bride was dressed in ochipock, and her mother tied a wimple (namitka). This ceremony was accompanied by singing. After covering the bride's head, korovai was brought and distributed according to the order of kinship and age.

The next rite was moving the bride to the groom's house, which began with supper.

The second day of the wedding took place on Monday and the third on Tuesday. The fourth day (according to B. Hrinchenko) in Galicia was called kolachyny. However, in different regions, this rite could take place even later.

Wedding in the Lemko region 

Weddings in the Lemko region were preceded by parties where youth gathered. If someone was looking for a girl, then they took starosty and went to the girl's house for a visit (also called zalioty), during which they agreed on wine. After that, the girl's parents went to visit the boy (ohliadyny). The wedding itself began on Saturday with a groomsmen's dance. On Thursday afternoon, the groom went to invite his relatives, friends etc. for a wedding, and on Saturday evening, groomsmen were doing it again. On the same day, at the bride's was being made rishchka. When the hudaky (musicians) played the wedding song, the guests began to gather, and a friend of the bride (svashka), who in the traditional ceremony was performed by the married sister of the groom, in her absence – another close relative, was putting on the wedding decorations. After the feast and blessing, the groom with music went to the bride, who was getting dressed at that time. From a bride, they went together to the church ceremony. After that, there was a feast at the bride's house as well as two hours of dancing and supper. When the supper was finished, people left or went to the groom. The svashky were going home at that time. The groom invited all the wedding guests to sit at the table and treat themselves. On Monday, all the guests of the groosman were invited to the groom, and svashky began to remove the vinets (a headgear) from brides head and put on chepets (also known as ochipok). After that, the bride distributes parts of rishchka. to the guests. Afterwards, there are dances and after the dances – prydany – the process, when wedding guests from the bride's side, go with her to the groom's house.

Wedding clothes

Wedding traditions

Ukraininan wedding in literature and art 

 Семен Гулак-Артемовський: інтермедія «Українське весілля» (1851)
 Іван Котляревський, «Наталка Полтавка» (1819 p.)
 Ман С. Українське весілля, Буенос-Айрес, 1944, 32 с.

References

External links 

 Весільні народні прикмети
 Весільні привітання
 Весільні тости
 Народний весільний обряд з Тернопільщини (youtube.com)
 15 років весілля та інші річниці
 Весільна обрядовість // Енциклопедія історії України: Україна—Українці. Кн. 1 / Редкол.: В. А. Смолій (голова) та ін. НАН України. Інститут історії України. — К.: В-во «Наукова думка», 2018. — 608 с. — С. 336–357.
 ВЕСЄЛЄ (Весілля) // Словник української мови XVI — першої половини XVII ст. Вип. 3: Б – В (Богъ – Весъной) / уклад.: М. Онишкевич та ін.; ред.: Д. Гринчишин, Л. Полюга; НАН України, Ін-т українознав. ім. І.Крип'якевича. — Львів, 1996. — C. 244. — 252 с. — ISBN 5-7702-1034-6.
 Калиновский Г. И. Описание Свадебных Украинских простонародных обрядов, в Малой России и в Слободской Украинской Губернии, также и в Великороссийских Слободах, населенных Малороссиянами, употребляемых, сочинённое Григорием Калиновским, армейских пехотных полков, состоявших в Украинской Дивизии, прапорщиком. — Санктпетербург: типография Х. Ф. Клена, 1777.
 Бракъ (у малороссїянъ) // Чулков М. Д. Абевега рускихъ суевѣрiй, идолопоклонническихъ жертвоприношеній, свадебныхъ простонародныхъ обрядовъ, колдовства, шеманства и проч. Сочиненная М. Ч. — Москва: в тип. Ф. Гиппїуса, 1786. — С. 43–64.
 Обряды при свадьбах у малороссиян. Северная пчела, 1832
 Иваница А. Обряды при свадьбе // Этнографический сборник, издаваемый Императорским Русским географическим обществом: Выпуск I. / Императ. Рус. Геогр. О-во. - Санкт-Петербург: В тип. М-ва внутр. дел, 1853. — 351–370.
 Религиозно-мифическое значение малорусской свадьбы. 1885 (рос. дореф.)
 Охримович В. Значение малорусских свадебных обрядов и песен в истории эволюции семьи. 1. Матриархат // Этнографическое обозрение. No. 4. – М., 1891. – С. 44–105. (рос. дореф.)
 Данковская Р. С. Свадебные обряды у малороссовъ Грайворонскаго уѣзда въ 1870-хъ годахъ // Этнографическое обозрѣніе. 1909. No. 2-3. — 1909. — С. 145–159. (рос. дореф.)
 Весільні пісні / Упоряд. М. М. Шубравська [Серія: Бібліотека української усної народної творчості]. — Київ: Дніпро, 1988. — 476 с.
 Шубравська М. М. Весілля. У двох книгах. — К., Наукова думка, 1970. — Книга 1; — Книга 2.
 Викуп молодої // Українська мала енциклопедія : 16 кн. : у 8 т. / проф. Є. Онацький. — Накладом Адміністратури УАПЦ в Аргентині. — Буенос-Айрес, 1958. — Т. 1, кн. II : Літери В — Ґ. — С. 155. — 1000 екз
 Кидати назад через голову // Українська мала енциклопедія : 16 кн. : у 8 т. / проф. Є. Онацький. — Накладом Адміністратури УАПЦ в Аргентині. — Буенос-Айрес, 1959. — Т. 3, кн. V : Літери К — Ком. — С. 627–628. — 1000 екз.
 Колачини // Українська мала енциклопедія : 16 кн. : у 8 т. / проф. Є. Онацький. — Накладом Адміністратури УАПЦ в Аргентині. — Буенос-Айрес, 1959. — Т. 3, кн. V : Літери К — Ком. — С. 671–672. — 1000 екз.
 Посад // Українська мала енциклопедія : 16 кн. : у 8 т. / проф. Є. Онацький. — Накладом Адміністратури УАПЦ в Аргентині. — Буенос-Айрес, 1963. — Т. 6, кн. XI : Літери Пере — По. — С. 1444. — 1000 екз.
 Проводини // Українська мала енциклопедія : 16 кн. : у 8 т. / проф. Є. Онацький. — Накладом Адміністратури УАПЦ в Аргентині. — Буенос-Айрес, 1963. — Т. 6, кн. XII : Літери По — Риз. — С. 1508–1509. — 1000 екз.
 Обрядовість весільна // Енциклопедичний словник символів культури України / за заг. ред. В.П. Коцура, О.І. Потапенка, В.В. Куйбіди. – Корсунь-Шевченківський: Вид. В. М. Гавришенко, 2015. – 911 c. – C. 558–560. ISBN 978-966-2464-48-1
 Частування // Українська мала енциклопедія : 16 кн. : у 8 т. / проф. Є. Онацький. — Накладом Адміністратури УАПЦ в Аргентині. — Буенос-Айрес, 1967. — Т. 8, кн. XVI : Літери Уш — Я. — С. 2043. — 1000 екз.

See also 

 Весільні чини
 Гільце
 Коровай
 Весільний рушник

wedding
Ukrainian